Santa Maria Immacolata all'Esquilino is a 20th-century parochial church and titular church on the Esquiline Hill in Rome, dedicated to Mary Immaculate.

History 

Santa Maria Immacolata all'Esquilino was built in 1896–1914 in the Gothic Revival style for the Friars of Charity (Frati della Carità, Bigi). The Bigi broke up in 1973.

In 2017, the church was purchased by the Society of Saint Pius X.

On 28 June 2018, it was made a titular church to be held by a cardinal-deacon.

Cardinal-Protectors
Konrad Krajewski (2018–present)

References

External links

Titular churches
Roman Catholic churches completed in 1914
20th-century Roman Catholic church buildings in Italy
Churches of Rome (rione Esquilino)
Buildings and structures of the Society of Saint Pius X
Gothic Revival church buildings in Italy